Shook is an album by the American band Algiers, released in 2023. The single "Irreversible Damage", featuring Zack de la Rocha, was released in October 2022.

Production
"Something Wrong?" is about a traffic stop involving a Black driver. A sample from "Subway Theme", by Grand Wizzard Theodore, appears on "Everybody Shatter". Samuel T. Herring sings on "I Can’t Stand It!" Backxwash appears on "Bite Back". Several tracks are spoken word pieces.

Critical reception

The New York Times wrote that "Algiers lashes out at injustice, exults in its sonic mastery and insists on the life forces of solidarity and physical impact." Pitchfork noted that "the group sounds most natural at their darkest—the reverbed growl of guitars, the synths colored with dirt and grime... They benefit from Matt Tong's virtuosic drumming, which feels looser and more alive than any drum machine."

The Daily Telegraph concluded that, "for uninitiates, Shook'''s sensory onslaught may resemble Public Enemy's Fear of a Black Planet, updated for the post-Trump era." Mojo determined that "Shook''s stories of struggle, pain and healing are painted in edgy electro, impassioned punk-soul, cloudbursts of jazz and rattlesnake trap pulses."

Track listing

Personnel
Credits adapted from the album's liner notes.

Algiers
 
Franklin J. Fisher – vocals (1-4, 6, 7, 9-12, 14, 15, 17), drum programming (1, 3, 4), mellotron (1, 9), guitar (1-4, 9, 10, 14), bass guitar (1-4, 10, 11), sampler (1, 3, 7, 11, 14, 17), tape player (1), synthesizers (2-5, 11, 12, 17), sequencing (2, 4, 10-12, 15), beat programming (2, 10-12, 15, 17), percussion (2), background vocals (5), vocal sequencing (5), B2 organ (7), sampling (10), cello (10), piano (10, 12), moog (10), string arrangement (10) 
 
Ryan Mahan – synthesizers (1-3, 6, 7, 9, 10, 12, 14, 15), bass guitar (1, 6, 9, 14, 15), sound design (1, 6, 14, 15), drum production (1, 2, 6, 9, 14), bell (1), vocals (1-3, 6, 9, 10, 14, 15, 17), drum programming (2, 6, 9, 14), guitar (3, 6, 9, 14),  background vocals (5), piano (6, 14), noise machine (6, 14), vocal production (10, 14), field recordings (17) 
 
Lee Tesche – guitar (1, 10, 14, 15), 2x4 (1, 12), glass bottle (1), sheet metal (1), sampler (1, 15, 17), field recordings (1, 8, 12, 13, 15, 17), electronics (1, 2, 4, 7, 9, 12, 14-17), vocals (1, 6, 7, 9), radio (2, 16), springs (2, 9), background vocals (5), tenor sax (7, 15, 17), programming (7), bells (7), pedal steel (7), percussion (10), test equipment (14), dub siren (15), tape manipulation (15), synthesizers (16) 
 
Matthew Tong – drums (1, 2, 6, 7, 9, 10, 14, 15, 17)

Other Personnel
 Big Rube – vocals (1, 5)
 Tristan Griffin – background vocals (1, 3, 9, 15)
 Ayse Hassan – background vocals (1)
 Mark Stewart – background vocals (1)
 Matthew Ricchini – drums (1, 3, 6, 14, 15, 17), synthesizers (1, 12), percussion (2), background vocals (5, 15), sequencing (12), beat programming (12)
 Zack de la Rocha – vocals (2)
 Monika Khot – background vocals (4)
 Billy Woods – vocals (6)
 Ashanti Mutinta – vocals (6)
 Mawa Keita – background vocals (6)
 Joe Bochniak – background vocals (6)
 Kyle Kidd – background vocals (6)
 James Longs – background vocals (6)
 LaToya Kent – background vocals (6), vocals (13)
 Mark Cisneros – double bass (7, 12), bass clarinet (7), flute (7), congas (7), tenor sax (1, 12)
 An Do – voice (8)
 Samuel T. Herring – vocals (10)
 Jae Matthews – vocals (10)
 Susan D. Mandel – cello (10)
 Brianne Lugo – viola (10)
 Alex Weill – violin (10)
 Gari Thomas – voice (11)
 Shea Curry – vocals (12)
 Robyn Fisher – background vocals (12)
 Sonya Belaya – prepared piano (12), electronics (12)
 Caleb Flood – electronics (12)
 Dave Dickie – synthesizers (13)
 Félix Blume – field recordings (13)
 Nadah El Shazly – vocals (14)
 DeForrest Brown Jr. – vocals (16)
 Patrick Shiroishi – alto sax (16)
 Lee Bains lll – vocals (17)

References

Algiers (band) albums
2023 albums
Matador Records albums